Mariya Serhiyivna Koryttseva  (born 25 May 1985) is a Ukrainian former tennis player.

On 18 August 2008, she achieved her career-high singles ranking of world No. 50. On 23 June 2008, she peaked at No. 39 in the doubles rankings.

Career
Koryttseva made a surprising run to the final of the Sunfeast Open, held in Kolkata, in September 2007. En route to her appearance in the final, she beat Monique Adamczak, Vania King, who had defeated the No. 1 seed Marion Bartoli in the previous round, Tatiana Poutchek and Anne Keothavong. Her run came to an end at the hands of Maria Kirilenko, who beat her in the final. She lost the doubles final as well.

She has won six doubles titles on the WTA Tour, two coming at Palermo, where she won with Giulia Casoni in 2005, and again with Darya Kustova in 2007. She won the 2008 ASB Classic with Lilia Osterloh. She was also the runner-up in doubles at Kolkata in 2007, where she lost the singles final, and lost the doubles final with Alberta Brianti to Vania King and Alla Kudryavtseva.

On the ITF Circuit, where she has played the majority of her career, she won 7 singles and 20 doubles titles. One of these came at the $100k event in Kharkiv.

In the second round of qualifying for the 2008 Kremlin Cup, Koryttseva beat Anastasia Pivovarova 6–3, 6–7, 7–5 in 3 hours and 55 minutes, making it the third longest match in the Open Era.

Between March 2012 and September 2015, Koryttseva didn't play any WTA or ITF tournament. She has not been on the pro circuit since May 2017.

WTA career finals

Singles: 2 runner-ups

Doubles: 10 (6 titles, 4 runner-ups)

ITF finals

Singles: 14 (7–7)

Doubles: 30 (20–10)

Grand Slam singles performance timeline

Top 10 wins

External links
 
 
 
 Ukrainian FedCup team Official site
  

1985 births
Living people
Sportspeople from Kyiv
Ukrainian female tennis players
Tennis players at the 2008 Summer Olympics
Olympic tennis players of Ukraine